The 1967 North Dakota Fighting Sioux football team, also known as the Nodaks, was an American football team that represented the University of North Dakota in the North Central Conference (NCC) during the 1967 NCAA College Division football season. In its tenth year under head coach Marvin C. Helling, the team compiled a 4–6 record (4–2 against NCC opponents), finished in third place out of seven teams in the NCC, and was outscored by a total of 164 to 123. The team played its home games at Memorial Stadium in Grand Forks, North Dakota.

Schedule

References

North Dakota
North Dakota Fighting Hawks football seasons
North Dakota Fighting Sioux football